The Communauté de communes du Pays Fertois is a former federation of municipalities (communauté de communes) in the Seine-et-Marne département and in the Île-de-France région of France. It was created in June 1970. It was merged into the new Communauté d'agglomération Coulommiers Pays de Brie in January 2018.

Composition
The communauté de communes consisted of the following 19 communes:

Bassevelle
Bussières
Chamigny
Changis-sur-Marne
Citry
Jouarre
La Ferté-sous-Jouarre
Luzancy
Méry-sur-Marne
Nanteuil-sur-Marne
Pierre-Levée
Reuil-en-Brie
Saâcy-sur-Marne
Sainte-Aulde
Saint-Jean-les-Deux-Jumeaux
Sammeron
Sept-Sorts
Signy-Signets
Ussy-sur-Marne

See also
Communes of the Seine-et-Marne department

References

Ferte